Gunder Gundersen Hammer (1725–1772) was a Norwegian politician and government official.  He served as the County Governor of Finnmark county from 1757 until 1768 and then he was transferred to be the County Governor for Stavanger county from 1768 until his death in 1772.

References

1725 births
1772 deaths
County governors of Norway